Frederick W. Hughes (a.k.a. Fred Hughes) (1943 - January 14, 2001) was Andy Warhol's business manager for more than 25 years and the executor of the pop artist's estate following his death in 1987.  He was also the publisher of Interview magazine. Following Warhol's passing Hughes founded the Andy Warhol Foundation for the Visual Arts. Hughes served as chairman of the foundation until 1990 when he was forced out by the man he appointed President of the enterprise, Archibald L. Gillies.

Hughes attended but did not graduate from the University of St.Thomas in Houston, Texas. He was mentored by the powerful De Menil family with whom he first came into contact while studying Art History at St.Thomas.

On June 3, 1968, he was on the scene at The Factory when Valerie Solanas shot Andy Warhol and art critic Mario Amaya.  Solanas subsequently tried to shoot Hughes but her gun did not fire and he told her to take the elevator down which she then did.

Hughes suffered from multiple sclerosis for eighteen years and succumbed to the ailment in 2001. He was 57.

References

People with multiple sclerosis
Andy Warhol
1943 births
2001 deaths